This is a list of provincial governors of the Taliban (Islamic Emirate of Afghanistan) from 1996 to 2001. Much of the information is drawn from a United Nations list of senior Taliban leaders.

References

Taliban